U-116 may refer to one of the following German submarines:
, a German Type U-115 submarine built by Schichau in Danzig.
 , a Type UB III submarine launched in 1917 for service in the First World War and was sunk on 28 October 1918 at Scapa Flow
 , a Type XB submarine that served in the Second World War and went missing in October 1942

Submarines of Germany